Ilisha megaloptera, the bigeye ilisha, is a species of ray-finned fish in the family Pristigasteridae. It occurs in the tropical Indo-Pacific region, in coastal waters, estuaries and the tidal parts of rivers.

References 

Fish of Thailand
Pristigasteridae
Fish described in 1839